Bored of the Rings is a text adventure game released by Delta 4 in 1985 for several computer systems written using The Quill. It was also released by CRL Group. The game is inspired by, but not based on, the Bored of the Rings parody novel published by Harvard Lampoon. The earlier game The Hobbit is also parodied. It was followed by a prequel in the same spirit, The Boggit.

Plot 
Fordo the Boggit, Spam, Pimply and Murky must take the Great Ring to Mount Gloom.

Gameplay 
The game is a standard text adventure with static background graphics in some locations. It accepts verb / noun commands and also short sentence inputs. It was split into three parts with parts two and three requiring password input to access.

Reception 
Zzap!64 thought the game was extremely funny but somewhat limited in terms of gameplay.  It was given an overall rating of 78%.

See also 
Kingdom O' Magic, another fantasy parody game by the same designer

References

External links 
 
 Bored of the Rings at Lemon 64
 
 

1980s interactive fiction
1985 video games
Amstrad CPC games
BBC Micro and Acorn Electron games
Commodore 64 games
CRL Group games
Middle-earth parodies
Parody video games
Single-player video games
Video games based on Middle-earth
Video games based on novels
Video games developed in the United Kingdom
ZX Spectrum games